This article is the discography of British new wave/sophisti-pop band The Blow Monkeys. Also included is the solo discography of frontman Dr. Robert.

Albums

Studio albums

Live albums

Compilation albums

Singles

Other appearances 

 Police Academy 4: Citizens on Patrol – "It Doesn't Have to Be This Way" (1987)
 Dirty Dancing – "You Don't Own Me" (1987)
 The Last Temptation of Elvis – "Follow That Dream" (1990)

Videos

Video albums

Music videos

Dr. Robert

Albums

Solo albums 

 Realms of Gold (1994)
 Bethesda Part One   (1995)
 Other Folk (1996)
 Flatlands  (1999)
 Birds Gotta Fly (2001)
 Flutes and Bones (2012)
 Out There (2016)

Collaboration albums 

 Five in the Afternoon (with P. P. Arnold) (2007)
 The Instant Garden (with Matt Deighton) (2023)

Live albums 

 Live in Tokyo (2004)
 Acoustic Blow Monkeys (2012)

Compilation albums 

 Keep on Digging for the Gold (2002)
 The Coming of Grace: An Introduction to Dr Robert (2009)

Singles

References 

Discographies of British artists
Pop music group discographies
New wave discographies